Divara – Wasser und Blut (Divara, Water and Blood) is a German-language opera by Azio Corghi to a libretto by the composer after the play In Nomine Dei by José Saramago, which tells the story of the Dutch "Anabaptist queen" Divara van Haarlem and the Münster Rebellion of 1534.

The opera was premiered at Theater Münster 31 October 1993. The opera had originally been conceived for performance in Italian, as Divara – acqua e sangue, as the composer's previous collaboration with Saramago, Blimunda, based on the 1994 novel Baltasar and Blimunda (original title Memorial do convento).

Recordings
Divara – Wasser und Blut, Münster Symphony Orchestra, Münster Theater Chorus, Musikverein Chorus, conductor: Will Humburg, 1993 Naxos Records

References

Operas
1993 operas
German-language operas
Operas based on plays
Operas set in Germany
Operas based on actual events
Operas based on real people
Cultural depictions of religious leaders
Cultural depictions of Dutch women
Operas set in the 16th century